Nototrichium divaricatum, also known as  Na Pali rockwort or kuluī (Hawaiian), is a rare perennial shrub in the pigweed family, Amaranthaceae, that is endemic to the island of Kauai in Hawaii.  It can be found in the northwestern part of the island in dry to moist shrublands, where it grows on north-facing cliffs and ridges.

Nototrichium divaricatum are densely branching shrubs 0.3–2 meters tall, with most parts covered with silvery-white hairs. Leaves are oppositely arranged, with leaf blades 3–7.5 cm long and 1–4.6 cm wide. Inflorescences bear several spikes, and are terminal and usually solitary, rarely 2 or 3 together, and compoundly branched. Each spike bears 8–30 small flowers.

This species was first described in 1996. There are possibly fewer than 3,000 N. divaricatum plants in existence.

References

Amaranthaceae
Endemic flora of Hawaii
Biota of Kauai
Plants described in 1996
Flora without expected TNC conservation status